Nuran (also Romanized as Nūrān) is a village in the Balghelu Rural District, Central District of Ardabil County, Ardabil Province, Iran. In the 2006 census, its population was 918, including 211 families.

References 

Towns and villages in Ardabil County